Kick-Ass 2 may refer to:
 Kick-Ass 2 (comics)
 Kick-Ass 2 (film), based on the comics
 Kick-Ass 2: The Game, based on the film